Edward Gordon Dundas Wright (3 October 1884 – 5 June 1947) was an English amateur footballer who competed in the 1912 Summer Olympics, being part of the English team, who won the gold medal in the football tournament. He played one match in this team. He was the captain of Hull City team for seven seasons in a row.

Club career
After attending St Lawrence College in Ramsgate, Wright went up to Queen's College in Cambridge, where he soon earned a place in the University XI for three years (1904–06), where he stood out for his excellent ball control and tactical knowledge as a outside left. On leaving Cambridge, he accepted a post at Hymer's College in Hull, teaching Natural History and Science, and in the same year, he was elected captain of Hull City for whom he played 152 league games. After obtaining his degree at Cambridge, Wright later graduated from the Royal School of Mines and in 1913 he went to South Africa as a mining engineer where, apart from a brief spell in America, he spent the rest of his life.

International career
Wright was the first Hull City player to be capped for the England national team, receiving his only cap in a 1–0 win over Wales on 19 March 1906.

Between 1909 and 1912, he won 20 amateur caps for the England amateur team, netting 4 goals and being a member of the English amateur team that represented Great Britain at the football tournament of the 1908 Summer Olympics.

International goals
England Amateurs score listed first, score column indicates score after each Wright goal.

References

External links
 
 
 

1884 births
1947 deaths
English footballers
English Olympic medallists
England international footballers
England amateur international footballers
Footballers at the 1912 Summer Olympics
Olympic footballers of Great Britain
Olympic gold medallists for Great Britain
Cambridge University A.F.C. players
Corinthian F.C. players
Hull City A.F.C. players
Portsmouth F.C. players
Olympic medalists in football
Medalists at the 1912 Summer Olympics
Association football outside forwards
English people of Irish descent
English Football League players
English emigrants to South Africa
People educated at St Lawrence College, Ramsgate